The Gullane Formation is a geological formation in Scotland. It preserves fossils dating back to the Visean stage (early Carboniferous period).

See also

 List of fossiliferous stratigraphic units in Scotland

References
 

Carboniferous System of Europe
Carboniferous Scotland
Carboniferous southern paleotropical deposits